KNSL (97.9 MHz) is a public radio station licensed to Lamoni, Iowa, United States. The station is owned by Iowa State University of Science and Technology and is an affiliate of Iowa Public Radio.

KNSL carries Iowa Public Radio's "News" and "Studio One" services, featuring news/talk programming in the daytime, from both IPR and National Public Radio.  Evenings, the station carries "Studio One," airing adult album alternative music on weeknights, with jazz, blues and folk music also heard on weekends.  KNSL is essentially a simulcast of WOI-FM, the flagship station in Ames, Iowa.

History
On August 6, 1984, the station signed on as KLAL.  It was originally on 97.7 MHz, broadcasting at only 1,300 watts, a fraction of its current power.  Dwaine F. Meyer was the owner, with KLAL playing adult contemporary music.

Around 1997, the station went off the air for a time to rebuild and move one notch up the dial to 97.9 MHz.  That was coupled with a boost in power to 50,000 watts.  When it returned to the airwaves, it was KIIC, owned by Continental Broadcasting of Iowa and playing classic country music.

In 2004, Iowa Public Radio paid $450,000 to buy the station.  It became a non-commercial public station.  The following year, the call sign was changed to KOWI.  The call letters were switched to KNSL in 2012 to indicate the station is an affiliate of IPR's "News" and "Studio One" networks in Lemoni.

References

External links

NSL
NPR member stations
Radio stations established in 1984
NSL
1984 establishments in Iowa
Iowa State University